Stephen Pettus Read (March 2, 1841 – June 8, 1917) was an American politician who served in the Virginia Senate and Virginia House of Delegates. He took office after his predecessor, E. Patterson McLean refused to take an oath supporting the 1902 state constitution.

References

External links 

1841 births
1917 deaths
Members of the Virginia House of Delegates
19th-century American politicians
20th-century American politicians